Ko Jum (เกาะจำ, also Koh Jum) or Ko Pu (เกาะปู) is a part of Nuea Khlong district in Krabi province, Thailand. Ko Jum consists of three villages: Ban Ko Pu, Ban Ting Rai, and Ban Ko Jum.

External links

Geography of Krabi province